Christos Lakkas (born December 5, 1991) is a Greek professional basketball player. He is a 6'2" (1.88 m) tall point guard.

Professional career
During his pro club career, Lakkas played in the Greek Basket League, with the Greek clubs Maroussi and Peristeri.

External links
Euroleague.net Profile
Eurobasket.com Profile
ProBallers.com Profile

1991 births
Living people
ASK Karditsas B.C. players
EFAO Zografou B.C. players
Doukas B.C. players
Greek men's basketball players
Irakleio B.C. players
Maroussi B.C. players
Pagrati B.C. players
Peristeri B.C. players
Point guards
Shooting guards
Basketball players from Athens